Theodore Fred Grefe (October 26, 1917 – October 27, 1989) was an American football player. 

Born in Des Moines, Iowa, Grefe attended Roosevelt High School and played college football for Northwestern. He served in the U.S. Navy and was stationed on a destroyer at Pearl Harbor until being transferred to submarine service shortly before the Japanese attack.  He played professional football in the National Football League (NFL) as a defensive end for the Detroit Lions. He appeared in two NFL games during the 1945 season.

References

1917 births
1989 deaths
American football ends
Northwestern Wildcats football players
Detroit Lions players
Players of American football from Des Moines, Iowa
United States Navy personnel of World War II